Cinema of the United Arab Emirates began with a number of feature films that were broadcast on national television since the late 1980s.

In 2002, Emirates Film Competition was formed which influenced a generation of Emirati filmmakers to explore the short film format. The competition was merged onto Abu Dhabi Film Festival, which would eventually be shut down along with the Gulf Film Festival.
However, the Dubai International Film Festival was founded in 2004 and continues its run till date. In April 2018, it was announced that the 15th edition of the festival would be postponed to 2019, re-launching as a bi-annual festival after running annually for 14 years

In 2005, The Dream became the first Emirati film to be distributed in cinemas across UAE.
Meanwhile, the UAE began to attract South Asian films and television serials, mainly Bollywood and Lollywood productions.

In addition, UAE has a film studio (Dubai Studio City) which has been built to cultivate film making in the region. The Dubai Film and TV Commission (DTFC) which was established in line with Executive Council Decision 16 of 2012 is the sole authority to issue film shooting permits in Dubai. In Abu Dhabi, the Abu Dhabi Film Commission issues shooting permits to production companies that hold a valid media zone authority trade license.

In 2008, Majid Abdulrazak became the first Emirati filmmaker to adapt a book into a film based on Wilfred Thesiger's Arabian Sands.

In 2009, the second edition of the Gulf Film Festival saw the premiere of two Emirati feature films for the first time. The Circle, by filmmaker and actor Nawaf Al-Janahi, told the story of Ibrahim, a poet and journalist who captures a thief and finds himself changing lives with him. Director and novelist Saleh Karama also showcased his first feature, Henna, in which the title character's mother is sick, and her frequent fits have led to a divorce; fatherless Henna has to find a way to relate to her new father-figure, a Bedouin relative who arrives from the desert with his camels to visit the family.

The sixth edition of the Dubai International Film Festival in 2009 featured further screenings of The Circle and the premiere of the multilingual City of Life by Emirati director Ali F. Mostafa, which went on to achieve general release in UAE cinemas in the following year.

Nawaf Al-Janahi's film Sea Shadow was released on 17 November 2011. It came out on DVD on 25 September 2013.

The first Emirati Science Fiction feature-length film called Aerials was released on 16 June 2016. Directed by S.A.Zaidi and produced by Ghanem Ghubash, Aerials was released in UAE simultaneously with Independence Day 2 as a contrast of both being alien invasion films.

The UAE also has its own independent cinemas such as The Scene Club and Cinema Akil, founded in 2007 and 2014 respectively. Cinema Akil became the first permanent independent cinema house in September 2018.

Abu Dhabi's Environment Agency's  Year of Zayed environmental documentary Zayed's Antarctic Lights which chronicled the adventure of the agency's Team Zayed to Antarctica, where they sent a message to the world in solar lights, won a Bronze World Medal at the New York TV & Film Awards.

Abu Dhabi's Environment Agency's 2021 environmental documentary Wild Abu Dhabi: The Turtles of Al Dhafra which showcases the turtles of Al Dhafra and the agency's conservation programme, won a finalist award in the 2021 New York Festivals TV and Film Awards.

Emirati films

Films shot in the United Arab Emirates
Ranam (Indian Shortfilm; 2022) Partly Filmed in UAE
Kaanal 3 : Gold Pass (Indian Shortfilm; 2023) Partly Filmed in Dubai, UAE
Wild Abu Dhabi: The Turtles of Al Dhafra (UAE, 2021) filmed in Bu Tinah, Al Dhafra, UAE
The Emirates (2021) filmed in the UAE (UAE, 2021)
 Our Sea. Our Heritage (UAE, 2019) filmed in UAE
 Saaho (Indian; 2019) partly filmed in Abu Dhabi
 Xero Error (2010) Filmed in Dubai
 Mission Impossible 6 (American; 2018) partly filmed in Abu Dhabi
 Zayed's Antarctic Lights (UAE; 2018) filmed in the UAE and Antarctica
 Back to the Wild (UAE; 2018) filmed in the UAE and Chad
 Race 3 (Indian; 2018) partly filmed in Abu Dhabi
 Tiger Zinda Hai (Indian; 2017) partly filmed in Abu Dhabi
 War Machine (American; 2017) partly filmed in Abu Dhabi
 Kung Fu Yoga (Chinese; 2017) partly filmed in Dubai
 Star Trek Beyond (American; 2016) partly filmed in Dubai
 Star Wars: The Force Awakens (American; 2015) partly filmed in Abu Dhabi
 Dishoom (Indian; 2016) partly filmed in Abu Dhabi
 Airlift (Indian; 2016) filmed in Ras Al Khaimah
 Furious 7 (American; 2015) partly filmed in Abu Dhabi
 Madhura Naranga (Malayalam) 2015
 Masterpiece (Kannada; 2015) one song
 Jacobinte Swargarajyam (Malayalam) 2015
 Happy New Year (Indian; 2014) largely filmed in Dubai
 Switch (Chinese; 2013) filmed in Dubai
 Casanovva (Indian; 2012)
 Oru Kal Oru Kannadi (Tamil; 2012) one song
 Diamond Necklace (Malayalam) 2012
 Dam 999 (Hollywood-Indian collaboration; 2011) partly filmed in Fujairah, UAE
 Oru Marubhoomikkadha (Malayalam; 2011)
 Singam (Tamil; 2010) one song
 Mission: Impossible – Ghost Protocol (American; 2010) partly filmed in Dubai
 The Kingdom (American; 2007) filmed in Abu Dhabi
 Risk (Indian; 2007)
 Arabikkatha (Malayalam) 2007
 Balram vs. Tharadas (Indian; 2006)
 Family: Ties of Blood (Indian; 2006) partly filmed in Dubai
 Keif al-Hal? (Saudi; 2006)
 36 China Town (Indian; 2006) partly filmed in Dubai
 The Killer (Indian, 2006) mostly filmed in Dubai
 Pehla Pehla Pyar (Pakistani; 2006) partly filmed in Dubai
 Tarap (Pakistani; 2006) partly filmed in Dubai
 Woh Lamhe (Indian; 2006) partly filmed in Dubai
 Kisse Pyaar Karoon (Indian; 2005) partly filmed in Dubai
 Chetna: The Excitement (Indian; 2005) partly filmed in Dubai
 Deewane Huye Paagal (Indian; 2005) partly filmed in Dubai
 El-Sefara fi El-Omara (Egyptian; 2005) partly filmed in Dubai
 Silsiilay (Indian; 2005) partly filmed in Dubai
 Syriana (American; 2005) partly filmed in Dubai
 Boom (Indian; 2003) partly filmed in Dubai
 Pyar Hi Pyar Mein (Pakistani; 2003) partly filmed in Dubai
 Talaash: The Hunt Begins... (Indian; 2003) partly filmed in Dubai
 Code 46 (British; 2003) partly filmed in Dubai
 Chalo Ishq Larain (Pakistani; 2002) partly filmed in Dubai
 Dil Vil Pyar Vyar (Indian; 2002) partly filmed in Abu Dhabi
 Dubai Return (Indian; 2005) partly filmed in Dubai
 Maine Pyar Kyun Kiya? (Indian; 2005) partly filmed in Dubai
 Mujhse Shaadi Karogi (Indian; 2004) partly filmed in Dubai
 Market (Indian; 2003) partly filmed in Dubai
 Om Jai Jagadish (Indian; 2002) partly filmed in Dubai
 Hera Pheri (Indian, 2000) dream-sequence song filmed in Dubai and its desert
 Lahoo Ke Do Rang (Indian; 1997) partly filmed in Dubai
 Vishwavidhaata (Indian; 1997)
 Naam (Indian; 1986) partly filmed in Dubai

Emirati directors 
 Abdulhalim Qayed
 Abdullah Hasan Ahmed
 Abdulla Al Junaibi
 Abdulla Al Kaabi
 Ahmed Zain
 Ali F. Mostafa
 Fayssal Bensahli
 Khaled Bensahli
 Jamal Salem
 Khaled Alrayhi
 Majid Abdulrazak
 Majid Al Ansari
 Nayla Al Khaja
 Nawaf Al-Janahi
 Saeed Salmeen Al-Murry
 Tariq Alkazim
 Rakan
 Rawia Abdullah
 Waleed Al Shehhi
 Nahla Al Fahad
 Ibrahim Bin Mohamed
 Ali Bin Matar

See also
 Arab cinema
 Egyptian cinema
 Cinema of Asia
 Cinema of the Middle East

References